Angus Sampson (born 1979) is an Australian actor and filmmaker. He is best known for his performances in the Insidious film series, The Mule, Mad Max: Fury Road, and the Peabody-winning second season of Fargo.

Early life
Sampson was born in Sydney, Australia, and was educated at Trinity Grammar School in Summer Hill and at The Armidale School in northern New South Wales. He graduated from the AWARD School in 2002.

Career

Acting
Sampson's acting career launched in 1996 with role as Dylan Lewis's sidekick on Recovery, an ABC youth music show. Later television jobs include roles on The Secret Life of Us, The 10:30 Slot, and Greeks on the Roof. and as Ali in an episode of Stingers. He has appeared a performer on the improvised show Thank God You're Here. In 2007, Sampson portrayed television personality Ugly Dave Gray in the television movie The King which examines the life of Australian TV legend Graham Kennedy. In the same year he also appeared in Wilfred. The following year he played Leonardo da Vinci in the children's television series Time Trackers and Michael Thorneycroft in the three final episodes of Underbelly.

In 2010, Sampson helped his friend and fellow former Recovery presenter Leigh Whannell develop a horror film called Insidious. The film was released in September 2010, with Whannell and Sampson playing "comical low-tech paranormal investigators" Specks and Tucker, roles they have reprised in the film's three follow-ups. Sampson was a special guest juror at the 2006 Melbourne International Film Festival, and host of the 2010 IF Awards, broadcast on SBS TV.

Sampson has since played a diverse array of film roles. In the same year as Insidious, he was the suit actor for the role of Bull in Spike Jonze's Where The Wild Things Are. In 2015, Sampson starred on the second season of the FX show Fargo, playing the character Bear Gerhardt. He starred as "Ozzy" in The Walking Dead. In 2022, Sampson played the lead role of Dennis "Cisco" Wojciechowski in the Netflix drama series The Lincoln Lawyer, based on the novel of the same name and written by David E. Kelley,

Radio 
Sampson was an occasional co-host of Australian radio show Get This with Tony Martin on Triple M. Sampson was a founding member of The Forbidden Fruit, an experimental troupe whose only performance was a risque interpretation of Mad Max 2 they performed on late night radio, in which Angus played The Lord Humongous, who turned out to be quite proficient with the jazz flute. Sampson has also been a presenter on RRR's Breakfasters program. In addition, Sampson was also the un-credited host of the cult classic late-night radio show The Lonely Hearts Club, a deadpan comedy series which ran on ABC Radio National in early 2011 in which Sampson appeared under the pseudonym Richard Silk.

Filmography

Film

Television

Accolades

References

External links

Angus Sampson Creative Representation CV

1970s births
Australian male film actors
Australian male television actors
Australian male voice actors
Living people
Male actors from Sydney
People educated at Trinity Grammar School (New South Wales)